The following is a list of compositions by Johannes Brahms, classified by genre and type of work.



References

External links

 Indexes of works at Klassika, sorted by chrono/opus/type/date/title, plus summary list of McCorkle's 1984 catalogue.
 Songs listed by title at the Lied and Art Songs Text page.
 Arrangements by Brahms and others from Johannes Brahms WebSource

 
Brahms, Johannes, compositions by